The 1954 All-Ireland Senior Hurling Championship was the 68th staging of the All-Ireland hurling championship since its establishment by the Gaelic Athletic Association in 1887. The championship began on 11 April 1954 and ended on 5 September 1954.

Cork were the defending champions and retained their title following a 1-9 to 1-6 victory over Wexford in the final.

Teams

A total of fourteen teams contested the championship, an increase of one on the previous championship. Antrim, who last participated at this level in 1949, re-entered the championship in spite of facing no competition in the Ulster Senior Hurling Championship.

Team summaries

Results

Leinster Senior Hurling Championship

First round

Second round

Semi-finals

Final

Munster Senior Hurling Championship

First round

Semi-finals

Final

All-Ireland Senior Hurling Championship

Semi-finals

Final

Championship statistics

Top scorers

Top scorers overall

Top scorers in a single game

Scoring

Widest winning margin: 44 points
Wexford 12-17 : 2-3 Antrim (All-Ireland semi-final)
Most goals in a match: 14
Wexford 12-17 : 2-3 Antrim (All-Ireland semi-final)
Most points in a match: 20
Wexford 12-17 : 2-3 Antrim (All-Ireland semi-final)
Most goals by one team in a match: 12
Wexford 12-17 : 2-3 Antrim (All-Ireland semi-final)
Most goals scored by a losing team: 4
Waterford 4-5 : 7-8 Cork (Munster semi-final)
Most points scored by a losing team: 9 
Laois 1-9 : 1-10 Meath (Leinster first round)

Miscellaneous

 Meath qualified for the Leinster semi-finals for the first time in the history of the championship.
 Antrim took part in the All-Ireland semi-finals for the first time since 1949.  It was their last game at this stage of the championship until re-entering the championship in 1984.
 Wexford's Nicky Rackard scores 7-7 in their All-Ireland semi-final meeting with Antrim.  It is believed to be a record score for an All-Ireland semi-final.
 Cork's Christy Ring wins a record-breaking eighth All-Ireland medal as Cork claim a third successive championship for the third time in their history.

Player facts

Debutantes

The following players made their début in the 1954 championship:

Retirees
The following players played their last game in the 1954 championship:

Sources

 Corry, Eoghan, The GAA Book of Lists (Hodder Headline Ireland, 2005).
 Donegan, Des, The Complete Handbook of Gaelic Games (DBA Publications Limited, 2005).
 Horgan, Tim, Christy Ring: Hurling's Greatest (The Collins Press, 2007).
 Nolan, Pat, Flashbacks: A Half Century of Cork Hurling (The Collins Press, 2000).
 Sweeney, Éamonn, Munster HUrling Legends (The O'Brien Press, 2002).

References

1954